Gymnocarpium oyamense is a species of fern in the oak-fern genus Gymnocarpium, family Aspleniaceae. It is found from Nepal to China and Japan and on to New Guinea. It has gained the Royal Horticultural Society's Award of Garden Merit as an ornamental.

References

oyamense
Ferns of Asia
Flora of Nepal
Flora of East Himalaya
Flora of Tibet
Flora of North-Central China
Flora of South-Central China
Flora of Southeast China
Flora of Taiwan
Flora of Japan
Flora of the Philippines
Flora of the Maluku Islands
Flora of New Guinea
Plants described in 1933